Charles-Hippolyte Dubois, better known as Dubois-Davesnes, (23 December 1800 [2 nivôse an IX] – 29 June 1874) was a 19th-century French playwright, actor, theatre director and theatre manager.

The sculptor Marguerite-Fanny Dubois-Davesnes (1832-1900) was his daughter.

Biography 
A jeweler worker and first prize for tragedy, he began his career at a very young age and aged 16 had his first play Maître Frontin à Londres presented at Théâtre de la Gaîté 17 April 1816. He made his actor debut 29 October 1822 at Théâtre de l'Odéon then was hired at Théâtre de l'Ambigu-Comique (1825), at théâtre du Vaudeville (1827–1828), again at l'Ambigu (1828-1829) then at l'Odéon (1830) where he obtained a great success in La Tour de Nesle by Alexandre Dumas. 
 
Stage director of the Théâtre du Gymnase then of the Théâtre des Variétés (1830-1850), he was general manager of the Théâtre-Français from 1850 to 1873. His plays were given on the most important Parisian stages of his time.

He also used the pen names Davenne, Davesne, Dubois, Dubois aîné and Dubois d'Avesnes.

Works 
 1816:  Maître Frontin à Londres, comedy in 1 act
 1827: L'Obligeant maladroit, comedy in 1 act mingled with couplets
 1828: Julien et Justine, ou Encore des ingénus, tableau villageois, with Charles Desnoyer
 1829:  Caïn, drama in 2 tableaux mingled with music, with Pierre-François Beauvallet
 1829:  Le Ménage du maçon, ou les Mauvaises connaissances, dramatic play in 6 days, with Desnoyer 
 1830: La Leçon de dessin, ou Mon ami Polycarpe, comedy in 1 act, with Desnoyer 
 1830: Les Trois jours, chant dithyrambique, with Pierre-François Beauvallet 
 1832: Notre-Dame de Paris, drama in 3 acts and 7 tableaux after the novel by Victor Hugo
 1834: Les Bons maris font les bonnes femmes, comédie-vaudeville in 3 acts, with Auguste Lepoitevin de L'Égreville and Valory
 1836: Le Muet d'Ingouville, comédie-vaudeville in 2 acts, with Jean-François-Alfred Bayard and 
 1837: Farruck le Maure, drama in 3 acts
 1838: Candinot, roi de Rouen, vaudeville in 2 acts, with Bouffé, Eugène Moreau, and Henri Horace Meyer
 1840: Le Père Turlututu, ou les Souvenirs, comédie-vaudeville in 1 act
 1840: Megani, ou les Comédiens du grand duc, comédie-vaudeville in 3 acts
 1842: Marie, ou Un dévouement de jeune fille, drame vaudeville in 3 acts
 1844: Une chaîne à rompre, vaudeville in 1 act
 1844: Fleur-de-Genêt, comédie-vaudeville in 2 acts
 1844: La Parisienne, comédie-vaudeville in 2 acts, with Émile Souvestre
 1845: Une nuit terrible, vaudeville in 1 act, with Saintine
 1846: Pierre Février, comédie-vaudeville in 1 act
 1848: La Reine d'Yvetot, vaudeville in 1 act
 1863: Les Vapeurs de la marquise, comédie-vaudeville en 1 act

References

Bibliography 
 Georges d'Heylli, Dictionnaire des pseudonymes, E. Dentu, 1869 (2e éd.), p. 90
 Henry Lyonnet, Dictionnaire des comédiens français, 1911

External links 
 Charles-Hippolyte Dubois-Davesnes on    

19th-century French dramatists and playwrights
19th-century French male actors
French male stage actors
French theatre directors
French theatre managers and producers
1800 births
Writers from Paris
1874 deaths